Isten may refer to:

Mythology
 Istanu, a god in Anatolian mythology
 Isten, an alternative spelling of Astennu, a figure in Egyptian mythology
 Isten is the word for God in the Hungarian language

Others
 Isten, áldd meg a magyart (God, bless the Hungarians), the opening line of Himnusz, the national anthem of Hungary
 Isten, hazánkért térdelünk  (God, We Kneel for our Country), a Hungarian anthem and anthology of Hungarian saints.
 Isten hozta, őrnagy úr! (The Toth Family), a 1969 Hungarian comedy-drama film directed by Zoltán Fábri
 Istensegíts (Ţibeni), a village within the commune of Satu Mare in Suceava County, Romania
 Istentó, a village within the commune of Band in Mureș County, Romania

ca:Llista de personatges de la mitologia egípcia#I